Niccolò "Lino" Miccichè (31 July 1934 - 1 July 2004) was an Italian film critic and film historian.

Born in Caltanissetta, Miccichè graduated in political sciences at the University of Florence. He made his debut as a film critic in 1956, and collaborated with various magazines and newspapers, notably L'Avanti!, as well as with radio and television programs. In 1964 he co-founded with Bruno Torri the Pesaro International Film Festival, which he directed for 25 years. In 1997 he briefly served as director of the Venice Film Festival, before becoming director of the Centro Sperimentale di Cinematografia. He was professor of history and critic of cinema at the Universities of Trieste, Siena and Roma Tre. He also directed several short films and the 1962 documentary film All'armi, siam fascisti.

References

External links
 

1934 births
2004 deaths
People from Caltanissetta
Italian film critics 
Italian male journalists
Italian essayists
Italian film historians
Male essayists
20th-century Italian writers
20th-century Italian male writers
20th-century essayists
University of Florence alumni
Academic staff of the University of Trieste
Academic staff of the University of Siena
Academic staff of Roma Tre University